Dirty wars are offensives conducted by regimes against their dissidents, marked by the use of torture and forced disappearance of  civilians.

Dirty War may also refer to:

Specific historical events 
 Dirty War (Argentina, 1974–1983), period of state-sponsored violence against dissident and other citizens carried out by the military governments of Jorge Rafael Videla and others
 Dirty War (Mexico), 1960s through 1980s internal conflict, between the US-backed PRI government and left-wing student and guerrilla groups
 GAL (paramilitary group) (Spain, 1983–1987), illegal death squads established to fight Basque separatist militants
 Years of Lead (Morocco) (1960s-1980s), period of state violence against dissidents under King Hassan II sometimes described as a dirty war
 The Troubles (1968–1998), ethno-nationalist conflict in Northern Ireland sometimes described as a dirty war

Other 
 Dirty Wars, a 2013 documentary film based on Scahill's book
 Dirty War (film), a 2004 British television film about a terrorist attack on central London
 Dirty Wars: The World Is a Battlefield, a 2013 book by Jeremy Scahill about U.S. covert warfare

See also 
 Guerra sucia (disambiguation) (Spanish for Dirty War)